Richardson may refer to:

People 
 Richardson (surname), an English and Scottish surname
 Richardson Gang, a London crime gang in the 1960s
 Richardson Dilworth, Mayor of Philadelphia (1956-1962)

Places

Australia
Richardson, Australian Capital Territory

Canada
Richardson Islands, Nunavut
Richardson Mountains, mountain range in northern Yukon

United States
Richardson, Kentucky
Richardson, Texas
Richardson, West Virginia
Richardson, Wisconsin
Richardson Bay, California
Richardson Beach, Hawaii
Richardson County, Nebraska
Richardson Township, Minnesota
Richardson Township, Butler County, Nebraska

Other uses
Richardson number, dimensionless number that expresses the ratio of potential to kinetic energy
Fort Richardson (Alaska) in Alaska, United States
Richardson (1903 cyclecar), an early British car
Richardson (1919 cyclecar), a car made in Sheffield, England
"Richardson", a 2011 single by Diego's Umbrella also released on their 2012 album Proper Cowboy
Richardson (lunar crater)
Richardson (Martian crater)

See also
 Justice Richardson (disambiguation)